"From Venus with Love" is the first episode of the fifth series of the 1960s cult British spy-fi television series The Avengers, starring Patrick Macnee and Diana Rigg, and guest starring Barbara Shelley, Derek Newark, Jon Pertwee, Jeremy Lloyd and Philip Locke. It was first broadcast in the Southern region of the ITV network on Monday 9 January 1967. ABC Weekend Television, who commissioned the show for ITV, broadcast it in its own regions five days later on Saturday 14 January. The episode was directed by Robert Day, and written by Philip Levene.

Plot
Several astronomers—and members of the British Venusian Society—have been found dead, their hair bleached white. The Society had planned on sending a satellite to the planet Venus. As Steed and Peel investigate, they discover all the astronomers had been looking directly at the planet before they were found dead, which members say heralds an invasion by the Venusians. Steed and Peel soon uncover a scheme featuring lasers, a treacherous eye surgeon Dr. Primble, and a quest to launch a satellite to monitor Venus.

Cast
Patrick Macnee as John Steed
Diana Rigg as Emma Peel
Barbara Shelley as Venus Browne
Philip Locke as Dr. Henry Primble
Jon Pertwee as Brigadier Whitehead
Derek Newark as Crawford
Jeremy Lloyd as Bertram Smith
Adrian Ropes as Jennings
Arthur Cox as Clarke
Paul Gillard as Cosgrove
Michael Lynch as Hadley
Kenneth Benda as Mansford
Joe Powell as Martin (uncredited)

Production
Writer Philip Levene first submitted this script in December 1965 for the show's fourth series under the title "The Light Fantastic." However it was rejected as being "too bizarre."

Abstract painting from the vault also appeared in episodes "Epic" (1967) and "Wish You Were Here" (1969). It can also be noticed in the series The Saint and The Power Artist.

Jeremy Lloyd (Bertram Smith) would later play an MI5 agent Carruthers in the stage play of The Avengers.

This was the first transmission of an Avengers episode that was filmed in colour (for the benefit of US viewers), even though the UK ITV network did not begin transmitting in colour until nearly three years later.

Radio adaptation
"From Venus with Love" was adapted as a radio play and directed by Dennis Folbigge. Starring Donald Monat as John Steed and Diane Appleby as Emma Peel, it was broadcast as part of The Avengers radio series on Springbok Radio, which transmitted between 6 December 1971 and 28 December 1973.

The adaptation contains a few changes, which include mention of the Mother (and a phone call to Steed, ordering him to investigate Cosgrove's death, but the voice on the phone is not heard). Dr. Henry Primble is much older in this adaptation. The new scene with Steed and Emma in a rooftop garden was added to the script.

There are also some production errors. For example, in episode 4, Hugh refers to Dr. Primble as "Primple". And in episode 2, Brigadier Whitehead is referred to as Major Whitehead.

References

External links

Episode overview on The Avengers Forever! website

The Avengers (season 5) episodes